Kevin Patrick Nugent (born 10 April 1969) is an English professional football manager and former player. He is the manager of the Millwall U23 team.

Playing career
Nugent began his career at Leyton Orient in the 1980s and made over 100 appearances in all competitions for the club, spending time on loan at Cork City during the 1988–89 season. After finishing the 1991–92 season as the club's top scorer, he signed for Plymouth Argyle in March 1992 for a transfer fee of £200,000 and made over 100 appearances for Plymouth. In September 1995, he moved to Bristol City for a fee of £75,000, although first-team opportunities were more limited.

Nugent signed for Cardiff City in June 1997 for a transfer fee of £65,000. After an injury hit first year at Ninian Park, Nugent enjoyed a strong second year, being awarded the club's player of the year award. He also later captained the side before an Achilles injury saw him lose his place in the side and later leave on a free transfer in January 2002 to return to Leyton Orient, where his career had begun.

In January 2003, Nugent signed for Swansea City on loan, making the move permanent a month later. He was released by the club's new manager Kenny Jackett in June 2004 but a week later, he was surprisingly re-signed as a player and also appointed assistant manager.

Including his appearances on loan, to the end of the 2005–06 season, Nugent had played 83 games for Swansea City in all competitions and had scored 19 goals. He retained his player registration, allowing him to play during injury crises, although he played only once during the 2005–06 season.

Kevin is an ex-pupil of Saint Ignatius College, Enfield.

Management career
Nugent started his coaching career as assistant manager to Kenny Jackett at Swansea City. When Jackett was sacked on 15 February 2007, Nugent became caretaker manager for two matches earning just one point. With Roberto Martínez taking over, and wanting to bring his own men in, Nugent's future was unclear until Martinez offered him the position of chief scout.

In June 2007, Nugent returned to his playing roots and became the Leyton Orient youth team manager. When Orient manager Martin Ling and his assistant Dean Smith were sacked on 18 January 2009, Nugent took over as caretaker manager. In his four games in charge, he won once; a shock victory at promotion chasing Milton Keynes Dons. Soon after Geraint Williams was installed as Leyton Orient's new manager, with Nugent retaining his role as assistant manager. On 3 April 2010, Williams was sacked and Nugent was once again installed as caretaker manager, remaining in charge for a 2–1 defeat to Southampton before returning to his role as assistant manager following the appointment of Russell Slade. On 25 September 2014, Nugent took over as caretaker manager once more, after Slade resigned a day earlier. He was then named interim manager on 16 October, before Mauro Milanese took over as manager on 27 October. Nugent returned to a coaching role at Orient before leaving the club on 22 January 2016.

On 29 January 2016, Nugent was appointed as first-team coach at Luton Town.

After six months with Luton, Nugent joined Charlton Athletic on 19 July as their assistant manager. He was named caretaker manager on 17 November, following the departure of manager Russell Slade, and won his first match in charge two days later, a 2–0 victory at home to Port Vale. Nugent's stint in caretaker charge concluded on 28 November, during which Charlton won twice and drew once under his tenure, with Karl Robinson taking over as manager.

Nugent was appointed head coach at League Two club Barnet on 15 February 2017. He parted company with Barnet on 15 April, after only winning one of 11 matches during his two months in charge. Nugent was appointed manager of the under-23 team at Millwall in August 2017.

Managerial statistics

References

External links

1969 births
Living people
Footballers from Edmonton, London
English footballers
Association football forwards
Leyton Orient F.C. players
Cork City F.C. players
Plymouth Argyle F.C. players
Bristol City F.C. players
Cardiff City F.C. players
Swansea City A.F.C. players
English football managers
Swansea City A.F.C. managers
Leyton Orient F.C. managers
Charlton Athletic F.C. managers
Barnet F.C. managers
Luton Town F.C. non-playing staff
Millwall F.C. non-playing staff
English Football League players
English Football League managers